Steve Sidwell (born 1982) is an English football midfielder.

Steve Sidwell may also refer to:

 Steve Sidwell (musician), English composer, conductor, and trumpeter
 Steve Sidwell (American football) (born 1944), American football coach